Nicholas John Keyworth Creed (born 28 August 1980) is an English cricketer.  Creed is a right-handed batsman who bowls right-arm fast-medium.  He was born at Cuckfield, Sussex.

Creed represented the Sussex Cricket Board in 3 List A matches.  These came against Herefordshire and Berkshire in the 2000 NatWest Trophy and the Worcestershire Cricket Board in the 2nd round of the 2003 Cheltenham & Gloucester Trophy which was held in 2002.  In his 3 List A matches, he took 3 wickets at a bowling average of 28.33, with best figures of 2/33.

References

External links
Nicholas Creed at Cricinfo
Nicholas Creed at CricketArchive

1980 births
Living people
People from Cuckfield
English cricketers
Sussex Cricket Board cricketers